Karl Hoffmann (7 December 1823 – 11 May 1859) was a German physician and naturalist.

Hoffmann was born in Stettin and studied at Berlin University. In 1853 he travelled to Costa Rica with Alexander von Frantzius to collect natural history specimens. With his wife, Emilia Hoffmann, he settled in San José, where he operated a consultation clinic and small pharmacy from his home. In order to supplement his income, he sold wine and liquor. He served as a doctor in the Costa Rican army during the invasion of William Walker in 1856. He died of typhoid in Puntarenas.

Hoffmann is commemorated in the names of a number of animals, including Hoffmann's two-toed sloth (Choloepus hoffmanni ), Hoffmann's woodpecker (Melanerpes hoffmannii ), the sulphur-winged parakeet (Pyrrhura hoffmanni ), Hoffmann's antthrush (Formicarius hoffmanni ), Hoffmann's earth snake (Geophis hoffmanni ), and a millipede Chondrodesmus hoffmanni (Peters, 1864).

Works about Karl Hoffmann
Karl Hoffmann : naturalista, médico y héroe nacional, by Luko Hilje Q; Santo Domingo de Heredia : INBio, 2006. (in Spanish).
Karl Hoffmann : cirujano mayor de ejército expedicionario, by Luko Hilje Q; Alajuela, C.R. : CUNA, 2007. (in Spanish).

References

1823 births
1859 deaths
Scientists from Szczecin
German naturalists
19th-century German physicians
People from the Province of Pomerania
Deaths from typhoid fever
Costa Rican physicians
Physicians from Szczecin
German emigrants to Costa Rica